Doc Maynard is a passenger-only ferry built for the King County Water Taxi. The vessel was named for David Swinson "Doc" Maynard, one of the pioneer founders of Seattle.

References

External links
 King County Water Taxi Homepage
 Doc Maynard Information (King County Water Taxi)

Ferries of Washington (state)
Transportation in King County, Washington
2015 ships
Water transport in Seattle
Ships built in Bellingham, Washington